Delphinella abietis is a species of fungus in the family Dothioraceae. It has been reported from western Norway where it infects needles and sometimes shoots of various fir species. These include subalpine fir, Nordmann fir including Turkish fir, Siberian fir and noble fir.

References

External links

Fungi described in 1962
Fungi of the United Kingdom
Fungi of Sweden
Dothideales